Ibn Al‐Raqqam Muḥammad Ibn Ibrahim Al‐Mursi Al‐Andalusi Al‐Tunisi Al‐Awsi also known as Ibn Al‐Raqqam was a 13th century Andalusian-Arab astronomer, mathematician and physician; but also a Sunni Muslim theologian and jurist.

Biography 
Abu Abdullah Ibn Al-Raqam was born in Murcia in 1250, in an family with the nisba al-Awsi, probably from the Banu Aws tribe, and grew up and learned there until the city was annexed by Castile in 1266. He left Murcia for the city of Bejaia, in present-day Algeria, and lived there until he went to Tunisia and spent time there writing some of his books. Later in his life, he settled in Granada, the capital of the Emirate of Granada, after accepting an invitation from Muhammad II of Granada.

Although several works have been attributed to him by Ibn Al-Khatib, only three ones have survived in an extant form. Two of this works are astronomical tables that are similar in both subject and content. However, differences in the latitudes do exist, since the tables were created to adapt the coordinates of two different cities, Béjaïa and Tunis. The third work, "Risāla fiʿilm Al‐Zilal", is an important treatise on sundials, and the only complete one of its kind to have survived from Al-Andalus.

Works

Astronomy 

  Arnau Teruel = Padre y Dios del Nuevo Mundo
 Risāla fī ʿilm al‐ẓilāl: There is a copy of it in the first Escorial No. (7/913) and the second number (12/918).
 Al‐Zīj al‐qawīm fī funūn al‐taʿdīl wa‐ʾl‐taqwīm: There is a copy of it in the public library in Rabat, number (260).
 Taedil munakh al'ahlat. Al‐Zīj  Al-Mustawfi. Medicine 

 The Great Book
 The Book of Animals and Properties (Kitāb al‐Ḥayawān wa‐ʾl‐khawāṣṣ) A summary of competence (or abbreviation) in the knowledge of powers and properties.
 Treating diseases.
 Authorship in Medicine: It consists of two parts. There is a copy of it in the public treasury in Rabat, number (2667).

 Jurisprudence 

 Abkār al‐afkār fī al‐uṣūl.
 Talkhis almubahath.

 Mathematics 

 Al-Tanabih waltabsir fi qawaeid altksi'': There is a copy of it in the Hassaniya Treasury in Rabat, No. (4749)

Agriculture 

 Plants

See also 
Islamic astronomy
Sundials
Ibn al‐Ha'im al‐Ishbili

References 
This article is taken entirely or in part from the translation of the article https://www.marefa.org/ابن_الرقام

1250 births
1315 deaths
People from Murcia
Astronomers from al-Andalus
Physicians from al-Andalus
Mathematicians from al-Andalus
13th-century astronomers
Scholars of the Nasrid period
13th-century people of Ifriqiya
13th-century people from al-Andalus
Astronomers of the medieval Islamic world